Marko Kravos (born 16 May 1943) is a Slovene poet, writer, essayist and translator from Trieste, Italy.

He was born in Montecalvo Irpino, a small village in the Southern Italian region of Irpinia, where his family was sent to confination by the Italian Fascist regime. He spent his childhood in Trieste, where he attended Slovene language schools. After graduating in Slavic philology at the University of Ljubljana in 1969, in Slovenia (then part of Yugoslavia), he worked in several publishing houses in Trieste. He also worked as a Slovene language professor at the University of Trieste. Between 1996 and 2000, he served as president of the Slovenian section of the International P.E.N.

Kravos writes poetry, essays and children's literature, as well as screenplays for radio. He is most renowned for his lyrical poems, which have been translated into 17 languages. His most famous poem is "Jason's Trace" (Jazonova sled).

Kravos also translates from Italian, Croatian and Spanish to Slovene. He translated works by Scipio Slataper, Elio Vittorini and Octavio Paz.

Awards 
1982 Prešeren Foundation Award for his poetry collection Tretje oko
2000 Astrolabio d'oro award for poetry

Notable works

Poetry 
 Trinajst, 1966
 Pesem, 1969 
 Trikotno jadro, 1972 
 Obute in bose, 1976 
 Paralele, 1977 
 Tretje oko, 1979 
 Napisi in nadpisi, 1984 
 V znamenju škržata, 1985 
 Sredozemlje, 1987 
 Ko so nageljni dišali, 1988 
 Obzorje in sled, 1992 
 Sredi zemlje Sredozemlje, 1993 
 Il richiamo del cucolo – Kukavičji klic, 1994
 Krompir na srcu, 1996 
 Vreme za pesna – Vreme za pesem, 1998
 Jazonova sled – Le tracce di Giasone – Jazonov trag, 2000 
 Sui due piedi, 2001 
 Potrkaj na žaro, 2001 
 Med repom in glavo, 2008

Prose

Prose for adults 
 Kratki časi – Trst iz žabje perspektive, 1999 
 U kratkim hlačicama, 2002

Prose for children  
 Tri pravljice: ena sladka, ena rahla, ena skoraj modra, 1991 
 Začarani grad, 1993 
 Male zgodbe iz velikega življenja Bineta Brrvinca, 1994 
 Ko je zemlja še rasla, (1996) 
 Hudič iz kravjega jajca in druge mastne zgodbe, 1996 
 Zlati rog, 2002 
 Škrat Škrip Škrap nagaja rad, (200 
 Podkovani zajec in modra oslica, 2005 
 Trst v žepu: pogled na zgodovino od popka dol, 2006 
 Ta prave od pet do glave, 2010

Translations  
Zlati slanik – L'aringa d'oro, 1974
Baside – Besede, 1985
Petrica Kerempuh, 1985
Moj Kras, 1988
Zimska pravljica, 1990
Per certi versi – Po drugi strani, 1995
V tem strašnem času, 1995
La peicia, 1996
Moja vojna, 2001
Libertades minimas – Prostodušne malenkosti, 2003
Dis ale sole e di altre parole – Iz soli in sonca in drugih besed; la nuova generazione in poesia a Trieste: nova generacija v tržaški poeziji, 2004
Plastične pregrade, kljubovalno cvetličenje – Sintetiche siepi, ostinate inflorazioni, 2007

References 
Biography 

Slovenian poets
Slovenian male poets
Slovenian essayists
Slovenian translators
Italian–Slovene translators
Spanish–Slovene translators
Writers from Trieste
Italian Slovenes
University of Ljubljana alumni
Academic staff of the University of Trieste
Living people
1943 births